Alvalade may refer to the following places in Portugal:

Alvalade (Lisbon), a freguesia (civil parish) in the municipality of Lisbon
Alvalade (Santiago do Cacém), a freguesia (civil parish) in the Santiago do Cacém Municipality, Alentejo
Estádio José Alvalade (1956), a former multi-purpose stadium in Lisbon, Portugal, home to Sporting Clube de Portugal
Estádio José Alvalade, the new football stadium of Sporting Clube de Portugal
Alvalade (Lisbon Metro), a station on the green Line of the Lisbon Metro